Water pie is a type of pie which has water as the main ingredient, along with sugar, flour, butter and sometimes vanilla extract. The recipe originated during the Great Depression and experienced a revival during the 2020s amidst the COVID-19 pandemic and its economic impact.

History 
Simplified recipes with alternative ingredients, including desserts such as Depression cake, were popular during the late 1920s and 1930s when most ingredients were scarce or unaffordable. Water pie in particular, dating back to 1929 cookbooks from the Great Depression in the United States, was resurfaced by TikTok users and food blogs in the 2020s, during the COVID-19 pandemic, many of which highlighted its low cost and simplicity.

Ingredients 
The pie is made by adding water mixed with sugar, flour and butter, and sometimes some spice such as vanilla or cinnamon, to a pie crust. The starch in the flour makes the mixture set and thicken, thus acquiring a custard-like consistency. Soft drinks such as Sprite may be used in place of water.

See also 

 Depression cake

References 

Pies 
Historical foods